Mary Herbert, Marchioness of Powis (died 8 January 1724), formerly Mary Preston, was the wife of William Herbert, 2nd Marquess of Powis and the mother of William Herbert, 3rd Marquess of Powis.

Mary was the eldest daughter and co-heir of Sir Thomas Preston, 3rd Baronet, of Furness and his wife, the former Mary Molyneux. She married the Marquess of Powis, then known as Viscount Montgomery because of his father's links with the deposed king James II and VII, in about 1695. Shortly afterwards he was imprisoned as a result of his Jacobite sympathies. He was restored to his title and estates and recalled to Parliament in 1722; at this time he regained possession of Powis Castle, which the family had lost as the result of an action during the English Civil War.

The couple had six children:

William Herbert, 3rd Marquess of Powis (1698–1748), who died unmarried
Lord Edward Herbert (died 1734), who married Henrietta, daughter of James Waldegrave, 1st Earl Waldegrave, and had one child, Barbara who married a kinsman, Henry Arthur Herbert, later created Baron Herbert of Cherbury in 1743, and Earl of Powis in 1748.
Lady Anne Herbert (died 1757), who married Henry Arundell, 6th Baron Arundell of Wardour
Lady Mary Herbert (1684 - 1775)
Lady Charlotte Herbert, who married twice
Lady Theresa Herbert (1706-1723), who married Sir Robert Throckmorton, 4th baronet

The marchioness died on 8 January 1724, and was buried within her husband's property at Hendon.

References

1724 deaths
English marchionesses
Daughters of baronets